Ranatunga is a Sri Lankan surname, which may refer to:

 Arjuna Ranatunga, (born 1963), cricketer - batsman and captain
 General Cyril Ranatunga, Army officer
 Dammika Ranatunga, (born 1962), cricketer - batsman
 Nishantha Ranatunga, (born 1966), cricketer - all-rounder
 Prasanna Ranatunga, politician
 Reggie Ranatunga, Politician
 Ruwan Ranatunga, Politician
 Sanjeeva Ranatunga, (born 1969), cricketer - batsman

Sinhalese surnames